Dana was a town located in Worcester County, Massachusetts. Dana was lost as a result of the formation of the Quabbin Reservoir.

History
Formed from parts of Petersham, Greenwich, and Hardwick, it was incorporated in 1801. The town was named for Massachusetts statesman Francis Dana. The town was disincorporated on April 28, 1938, as part of the creation of the Quabbin Reservoir.  Upon disincorporation, all of the town was returned to the adjacent town of Petersham.  The majority of the land of the former town is still above water.

As with the nearby town of Prescott, after the disincorporation, houses were moved or razed, but cellar holes remained.  The public is only allowed to visit the former town of Dana by foot, as the old narrow road is blocked off to cars.  In the town center (which is still somewhat maintained by the Massachusetts Department of Conservation and Recreation), a stone marker has been installed, which reads: "SITE OF DANA COMMON 1801-1938 To all those who sacrificed their homes and way of life (Erected by Dana Reunion, 1996)".  The common and a  area encompassing the former town center has been listed on the National Register of Historic Places.

Other Quabbin towns
Greenwich
Enfield
Prescott

See also
National Register of Historic Places listings in Worcester County, Massachusetts

External links
 https://web.archive.org/web/20161017095551/http://menotomymaps.com/quab_1.html. Map showing the towns buried under Quabbin as they looked in 1912 with original house locations and current reservoir water level.

References
 Tougias, Michael.  Quabbin: A History And Explorer's Guide.  Yarmouth Port, Massachusetts: On Cape Publications, 2002.)

Defunct towns in Massachusetts
Ghost towns in Massachusetts
Geography of Worcester County, Massachusetts
1938 disestablishments in Massachusetts
Forcibly depopulated communities in the United States
National Register of Historic Places in Worcester County, Massachusetts
1801 establishments in Massachusetts
Populated places on the National Register of Historic Places
Populated places established in 1801
Populated places disestablished in 1938
Petersham, Massachusetts